Regresará Por Mí is the debut album from Puerto Rican Christian singer Julissa It was released in 1998 through Cross Movement Records.

Track listing

All songs written by Mike Rivera, except where noted.
 "Regresara Por Mi" - 04:03
 "Lo Que Eres Para Mi" - 04:16
 "Te Prometo" - 05:00
 "Con Cada Latido" - 04:34
 "El Centro De Mi Vida" - 03:55
 "El Misterio Del Calvario" (Canales) - 04:04
 "Fiel" - 03:56
 "A Ti Elevo Mi Voz" (Julissa Arce, Mike Rivera) - 05:28
 "Inagotable Amor" - 05:14
 "Nombre Sobre Todo Nombre" - 04:37
 "Sal De La Tierra" (Mejias, Rivera) - 03:33
 "Tu Misericordia" - 04:27

Awards

In 1999, the album won a Tu Música Awards in Puerto Rico for Christian Album of the Year, and a Tito Lara Award for Album of the Year. It was also nominated for two Viva Awards in Guatemala for International Album of the Year and International Singer of the Year.

Notes

External links
 Regresará Por Mí on Amazon.com

1998 albums
Julissa (singer) albums